Collindridge is a surname. Notable people with the surname include:

Colin Collindridge (1920–2019), British footballer 
Frank Collindridge (1891–1951), British politician
Fred Collindridge (1899–1969), British trade union leader

See also
Collingridge